The Last Waltz is a 1936 British musical film directed by Leo Mittler, and starring Jarmila Novotna, Harry Welchman, and Gerald Barry. Barry also provided some assistance with the direction. It was made at the Billancourt Studios in Paris as the English-language version of the French film La dernière valse. It was part of a trend of operetta films during the middle of the decade, and was based on the 1920 operetta The Last Waltz by Oscar Strauss.

The film's sets were designed by the art directors Robert Gys and Emil Hasler.

Cast
 Jarmila Novotna as Countess Vera Lizavetta
 Harry Welchman as Count Dmitri
 Gerald Barry as Prince Paul
 Josephine Huntley Wright as Babushka
 Toni Edgar-Bruce as Countess
 Betty Huntley-Wright
 Bruce Winston
 Jack Hellier
 Paul Sheridan
 Bella Milo
 Pamela Randall
 MacArthur Gordon
 E. Fitzclarence
 Elizabeth Arkell
 Madge Snell

See also
 The Last Waltz (1927)
 The Last Waltz (1934)
 The Last Waltz (France, 1936)
 The Last Waltz (1953)

References

Bibliography
 Low, Rachael. Filmmaking in 1930s Britain. George Allen & Unwin, 1985.
 Wood, Linda. British Films, 1927-1939. British Film Institute, 1986.

External links

1936 films
British musical comedy films
1936 musical comedy films
Operetta films
Films based on operettas
Films shot at Billancourt Studios
Films directed by Leo Mittler
British multilingual films
British remakes of German films
Films set in Russia
Films set in the 1900s
British black-and-white films
Films scored by Oscar Straus
1936 multilingual films
1930s English-language films
1930s British films